Rosmini may refer to:

 Antonio Rosmini-Serbati (1797–1855), Italian Roman Catholic priest and philosopher
 Dick Rosmini (1936–1995), American guitarist
 Diego Rosmini (born 1927), Italian Mafia boss
 Rosmini College, New Zealand Integrated single-sex boys secondary school